Louisiana is a 1984 Franco - Italian - Canadian film directed by Philippe de Broca. The film score was composed by Claude Bolling.

Synopsis
The action is located in Louisiana in the mid-nineteenth century. Virginia will fight to get possession of the Bagatelle estate after it was lost during the American Civil War.

Cast
 Margot Kidder as Virginia Tregan
 Ian Charleson as Clarence Dandridge
 Andréa Ferréol as Mignette
 Lloyd Bochner as Adrien Damvillier
 Victor Lanoux as Charles de Vigors
 Len Cariou as Oswald
 Hilly Hicks as Brent
 Raymond Pellegrin as Morley
 Ken Pogue as Dr. Murphy
 Akosua Busia as Ivy
 Corinne Marchand as Anne McGregor
 James Bearden as Percy Templeton
 Larry Lewis as Adrien II
 Wayne Best as Major McGregor
 Ron L. Lewis as Pierre Damvillier
 Angus MacInnes as Albert
 Alex Liggett as Adrien II, Child
 Matthew Breeding as Pierre, Child
 Scott Burnelle as Fabian
 Kellie Brasselle as Julie
 Tara Winder as Ivy, Child
 Mark Polley as Adrien McGregor I
 Timothy Patterson as Joe "Little Joe"
 Michael J. Reynolds as General Bank
 Ron Cural as Bradley
 Pat Perkins as Nella
 Becki Davis as Betty Templeton
 Valerian Smith as Theodore
 Beata Tyszkiewicz as Comtesse

Production

As an international co-production, the making of Louisiana required an international cast and crew. The Hungarian-born Canadian  John Kemeny was responsible for the overall production. The original French director was Jacques Demy who was replaced by Philippe de Broca, also from France, assisted by Emmanuel Gust. Financing of the $13 million production included pre-sale to television as a six-hour miniseries (on HBO). Because it was also intended for international theatrical release, two different scripts were used, meaning some characters appearing in the mini-series did not appear in the film.

The screenplay was by Dominique Fabre, Chuck Israel, John Melson, Étienne Périer, based on the first two novels of Maurice Denuzière's six-volume Louisiane suite, "Louisiane" (1977) and "Fausse-Rivière" (1979).
 
It was filmed in and around Nottoway Plantation house outside New Orleans. The production was plagued by problems, including a near hurricane which caused delays, and the Mississippi River, which overflowed and destroyed a large outdoor set.

Production credits

Artistic direction: Ivo Cristante, Randy Moore
Sets: John McAdam
Costumes: John Hay
Photography: Michel Brault
Poster: Yves Thos
Sound: Jean-Charles Ruault
Editing: Henri Lanoë
Music: Claude Bolling
Associate production company: Gabriel Boustani
Executive producers: Denis Heroux, John Kemeny
Production company :
France A2 Movies
Espagne Filmax
Canada International Cinema Corporation
Italie Radio Televisione Italiana
Distribution: Parafrance
Original language: French and English
Format: colour - 35 mm - 1.37: 1 - Mono sound
Genre : historical film
Duration: 187 minutes
Release dates: France : January 22 , 1984

References

External links
 
 Louisiana on the Ciné-Ressources website (fr)
 Louisiana on Unifrance (fr)

1984 films
Films directed by Philippe de Broca
Films set in Louisiana
Films set in the 19th century
Films shot in Louisiana
Films scored by Claude Bolling
Films based on French novels